The Indigenous peoples of Peru, or Native Peruvians, comprise a large number of ethnic groups who inhabit territory in present-day Peru. Indigenous cultures developed here for thousands of years before the arrival of the Spanish in 1532.

In 2017, 5,500,000  Peruvians identified themselves as indigenous peoples and formed about 24% of the total population of Peru. At the time of the Spanish arrival, the indigenous peoples of the rain forest of the Amazon basin to the east of the Andes were mostly semi-nomadic tribes; they subsisted on hunting, fishing, gathering and slash and burn agriculture. Those peoples living in the Andes and to the west were dominated by the Inca Empire, who had a complex, hierarchical civilization. It developed many cities, building major temples and monuments with techniques of highly skilled stonemasonry.

Many of the estimated 2000 nations and tribes present in 1500 died out as a consequence of the expansion and consolidation of the Inca Empire and its successor after 1533, the Spanish empire. In the 21st century, the mixed-race mestizos are the largest component of the Peruvian population.

With the arrival of the Spanish, many Natives perished due to Eurasian infectious diseases among the foreigners, to which they had acquired no immunity.

All of the Peruvian Indigenous groups, such as the Urarina, and even those who live isolated in the most remote areas of the Amazon rainforest, such as the Matsés, Matis, and Korubo, have changed their ways of life to some extent under the influence of European-Peruvian culture. They have adopted the use of firearms and other manufactured items, and trade goods, although they remain separated from mainstream Peruvian society. Many Indigenous groups work to uphold traditional cultural practices and identities.

Origins

Anthropological and genetic evidence indicates that most of the original population of the Americas descended from migrants from North Asia (Siberia) who entered North America across the Bering Strait in at least three separate waves. DNA analysis has shown that most of those resident in Peru in 1500 were descended from the first wave of Asian migrants, who are theorized, but not proven conclusively, to have crossed Beringia at the end of the last glacial period during the Upper Paleolithic, around 24,000 BCE. Migrants from that first wave are thought to have reached Peru in the 10th millennium BCE, probably entering the Amazon basin from the northwest.

The Norte Chico civilization of Peru is the oldest known civilization in the Americas and one of the six sites where civilization, including the development of agriculture and government, separately originated in the ancient world.

During the pre-Columbian era, the peoples who dominated the territory now known as Peru spoke languages, such as: Quechua, Aymara, Jivaroan, Tsimané, Tallán, Culli, Quingnam, Muchik, and Puquina. The peoples had different social and organizational structures, and distinct languages and cultures.

Demographics
According to the National Institute of Statistics and Informatics, out of a 31,237,385 population, the Indigenous people in Peru represent about 25.7%. Of those, 95.8% are Andean and 3.3% from the Amazon. Other sources indicate that the Indigenous people comprise 31% of the total population.

In the Amazonian region, there more than 65 ethnic groups classified into 16 language families. After Brazil in South America and New Guinea in the Pacific Ocean, Peru is believed to have the highest number of uncontacted tribes in the world.

After the Spanish conquest

After the arrival of Spanish soldiers in Peru, local people began dying in great number from Eurasian infectious diseases that were chronic among the foreigners. These spread by contact across the New World by Indigenous peoples along trading routes, often years ahead of direct contact with the invaders. As the natives have no natural immunity, they suffered high fatalities in epidemics of the new diseases.

Marriage 
Women typically got married around 16 years old while men typically married when they were 20 years old. Before the Spanish Inquisition, Incas often engaged in trial marriages. Trial marriages typically lasted a few years and at the end of the trial, both the man and the woman in the relationship could decide to either pursue the relationship or return home. According to Powers, “Andean peoples had clearly understood, long and before the ride of the Inca state, that women’s work and men’s work were complementary and interdependent, that the group’s economic subsistence could not be attained in the absence of one or the other.”  Once married, women often stayed home to watch over children and livestock, collect food, cook, weave, etc. On the other hand, men often took on more physically taxing responsibilities.

Intermarriage 
From the earliest years, Spanish soldiers and colonists intermarried with the Indigenous women. The Spanish officers and elite married into the Inca elite, and other matches were made among other classes. A sizeable portion of the Peruvian population is mestizo, of Indigenous and European ancestry, speaking Spanish, generally Roman Catholic, and assimilated as the majority culture.

In the late 19th century, major planters in Peru, particularly in the northern plantations, and in Cuba, recruited thousands of mostly male Chinese immigrants as laborers, referred to as "coolies". Because of the demographics, in Peru these men married mostly non-Chinese women, many of them Indigenous Peruvians, during that period of a Chinese migration to Peru. In the late 20th and 21st centuries, many scholars have studied these unions and the cultures their descendants created.

The Chinese also had contact with Peruvian women in cities, where they formed relationships and sired mixed-race children. Typically the Indigenous women had come from Andean and coastal areas to work in the cities. Chinese men favored marriage with them over unions with African Peruvian women. Matchmakers sometimes arranged for mass communal marriages among a group of young Peruvian women and a new group of Chinese coolies. They were paid a deposit to recruit women from the Andean villages for such marriages.

In 1873 the New York Times reported on the Chinese coolies in Peru, describing their indentured labor as akin to slavery. It also reported that Peruvian women sought Chinese men as husbands, considering them to be a "catch" and a "model husband, hard-working, affectionate, faithful and obedient" and "handy to have in the house".

As is typical in times of demographic change, some Peruvians objected to such marriages on racial grounds. When native Peruvian women (cholas et natives, Indias, indígenas) and Chinese men had mixed children, the children were called injerto. As adults, injerto women were preferred by Chinese men as spouses, as they had shared ancestry.

According to Alfredo Sachettí, low-class Peruvians, including some black and Amerindian women, were the ones who established sexual unions or marriages with the Chinese men. He claimed this mixing was causing the Chinese to suffer from "progressive degeneration". In Casa Grande highland Amerindian women and Chinese men participated in communal "mass marriages", arranged when highland women were brought by a Chinese matchmaker after receiving a down payment for the marriage.

Gender 
Gender was defined and reinforced throughout different stages in a child's life: from ages 3 and under both males and females were referred to as “Wawa,” from ages 3–7 both males and females were referred to as “Warma,” from ages 7–14 females were referred to as “Thaski” (or “P’asña”) and males were referred to as “Maqt’a,” from ages 14–20 females were referred to as “Sipas” and males were referred to “Wayna,” from ages 20–70 females were referred to as “Warmi” and males were referred to as “Qhari,” from ages 70–90 females were referred to as “Paya” and males were referred to as “Machu,” from ages 90+ both females and males were referred to as “Ruku.” 

Before Spanish colonization, Incas recognized a third non-binary gender called “Qariwarmi.”  According to scholar Micheal Horswell, "qariwarmi (men-women) shamans mediated between the symmetrically dualistic spheres of Andean cosmology and daily life by performing rituals that at times required same-sex erotic practices. Their transvested attire served as a visible sign of a third space that negotiated between the masculine and the feminine, the present and the past, the living and the dead. Their shamanic presence invoked the androgynous creative force often represented in Andean mythology." In terms of gender dynamics/ roles, there was a lot of gender parallelism in Incan society. In other words, men and women worked and operated as counterparts and one gender was not subordinate to the other.

Spanish colonization largely disrupted gender and gender expression in the Incan Empire. During the 1570s, Francisco de Toledo, Viceroy of Peru, created ordinances that prohibited male Incas from wearing their hair as long as female Incas, men from dressing like women, and women from dressing like men. Punishments for such offenses included 100 lashes for a first-time offense, being tied to a pole for 6 hours for a second-time offense, and remittance to the magistrate of the valley for a third time offense.

Homosexuality in Inca Empire 

Moche, an Andean civilization in Peru that pre-dated the Incan Empire, are thought to have accepted homosexuality. According to Crompton, about 40% of huacos from the period depict both men and women engaging in same-sex relations. While it is still unclear how homosexuality was perceived in the Incan Empire, similar to Moche huacos, Incan ceramics suggest that homosexuality was accepted in the Incan Empire before Spanish colonization. Some of the ceramics found depict two men having anal sex, while others emphasize female sexual pleasure; both challenge the idea that sex is solely meant for procreation. Further evidence suggests that in Incan society, lesbians were referred to as “holioshta” and were highly valued.

After arriving in Peru, Francisco de Toledo (the Viceroy of Peru) was shocked by both the presence of homosexuality and premarital sex in Incan society. Historian Maximo Terrazo claims that after his arrival, “Toledo ordered that evangelized natives caught cohabiting outside church-sanctioned wedlock receive 100 lashes of the whip.” Furthermore, under the Spanish inquisition, “homosexuals could be burned at the stake. The majority of the Moche huacos and Incan ceramics that depicted homosexual behavior, pleasurable female sex, and masturbation were destroyed by Toledo and his clergymen. Terrazo further suggests that such things became considered a “taboo imposed by the Christian religion that men have sex only for procreation and that women do not experience sexual pleasure.”

Education and language 
Significant test score gaps exist between Indigenous students and non-Indigenous students in elementary schools. In addition, Peru has over 60 distinct Amerindian linguistic groups, speaking languages beyond Spanish and the Incan Quechua, not all of which are recognized. Indigenous groups, and therefore language barriers to education, remain a problem primarily in the sierra (Andean highlands) and the selva (Amazon jungle) regions of Peru, less in the cities of the costa (coast). Throughout the second half of the 20th century, steps have been made to target and strengthen Indigenous communities' education, starting with the introduction of bilingual education throughout the country, promoting teaching in both Spanish and Quechua or other Indigenous languages. Quechua was made an official language of Peru in 1975, and while it was later qualified to specific regions of the country and for specific purposes, it is still recognized as equal to Spanish in some regions.

Activists promoting intercultural bilingual education view it as being the solution for a more "equitable, diverse, and respectful society", garnering social economic, political, and cultural rights for Indigenous groups while simultaneously encouraging "Indigenous autonomy and cultural pride". Criticisms of bilingual education have been raised, in some cases most strongly by Quechua-speaking highlanders themselves, strongly opposing intercultural efforts. These Indigenous highlanders view intercultural efforts as an imposition of "disadvantageous educational changes" blocking their economic and social advancement, historically seen as only possible through learning to read and write Spanish. While the legislation has been one of the most forward in Latin America concerning Indigenous education, the implementation of these educational programs has been technically challenging, with teachers agreeing in theory but finding it impossible in practice to bring an intercultural mindset and facilitate bilingualism, particularly with often very limited resources. However, in contrast, studies by Nancy Hornberger and others have shown that the use of children's native language in schools did allow for far greater "oral and written pupil participation - in absolute, linguistic, and sociolinguistic terms".

With a lack of political will and economic force to push a nationally unified bilingual education program, many disconnected efforts have been put forth. The National Division of Intercultural Bilingual Education (DINEBI) was started, among other efforts, and worked to further incorporate bilingual and intercultural education. The Program for the Training of Native Bilingual Teachers (FORMABIAP) is another example of intercultural education efforts, focusing particularly on the Amazon regions of Peru.

Territories
Indigenous people hold title to substantial portions of Peru, primarily in the form of communal reserves. The largest Indigenous communal reserve in Peru belongs to the Matsés people and is located on the Peruvian border with Brazil on the Javary River.

Laws and institutions
In 1994, Peru signed and ratified the current international law concerning Indigenous people, the Indigenous and Tribal Peoples Convention, 1989. The convention rules the following: governments are responsible for ensuring that Indigenous peoples possess equal rights and opportunities under national law, for upholding the integrity of cultural and social identity under these rights, and for working toward elimination of existing socio-economic gaps between Indigenous peoples and the rest of the respective national community. To ensure these aims, the convention additionally mandates that governments are to consult communities through their representative institutions regarding any legislature that openly affects their communities, provide modes through which Indigenous peoples can participate in policy decision-making to the same extent as other divisions of the national community, and allocate support, resources, and any other necessary means to these communities for the complete development of their own institutions. The extent to which Peru upholds this legislation is debated, especially in regards to use of Indigenous territories for capital gain. Additionally, implementation of legislature has been protracted, with Indigenous peoples only gaining the legal right to consultation as late as 2011.

Political organizations
Among the more informal organizations in Indigenous communities is the tradition of Rondas Campesinas. Under General Juan Velasco Alvarado’s dictatorial military regime, lasting from 1968 to 1975, the government took on a pro-Andean and pro-Indigenous, nationalist-oriented agenda. This regime broke up Peru's traditional Hacienda system and installed a system of land management based largely around state-run farm cooperatives; however, due to weak state presence beyond coastal regions, the Indigenous peasantry organized local civil defense patrols known as Rondas Campesinas to guard against land invasions. Although their relationship to the government was traditionally ambiguous, they gained more official authority from the government when they rose as an opposing force to the Shining Path guerrilla movement. Rondas Campesinas still function as a form of political organization among communities northern Peru, however their role has largely decreased, as has their legal formality.

The late 2010s have seen a push for autonomous regional governments for Indigenous communities. The Autonomous Territorial Government of the Wampis Nation (GTANW) of the Peruvian Amazon was the first to be established. Other communities followed, including the Kandozi, Shawi, and Shapra peoples, and additional communities are expressing interest in pursuing autonomous governments. The primary function of these governments is to both protect autonomous territories from resource extraction by foreign entities as well as enhance dialogue between the Peruvian state and Indigenous communities through fortified institutions. The Autonomous Territorial Government of the Wampis Nation, established officially in November 2015, has since started operating an autonomous radio broadcaster to service the communities of the Santiago River basin, where the new government is also taking on issues of illegal mining in the area.

Beyond organizations based in regional autonomy, other notable organizations exist for the purpose of establishing Indigenous representation of interests in Peruvian politics. This includes organizations such AIDESEP, the Asociacion Inter-etnica para el Desarollo de la Selva Peruana (Interethnic Association for the Development of the Peruvian Jungle), which defends the collective rights of Indigenous peoples in the Peruvian Amazon. AIDESEP represents 64 Indigenous groups in total. Also based out of the Amazon River Basin is the organization MATSES (Movement in the Amazon for Tribal Subsistence and Economic Sustainability). Unlike the coalition-style organization of AIDESEP, MATSES is a nonprofit organization run specifically by members of the Matsés community; the central aim of this organization is to build the proper institutions to preserve both Matsés culture and lands without influence from external sources of funding or leadership.

Ethnic groups

 Achuar, Amazon
 Aguano, Amazon
 Aguaruna, Amazon, northern Peru
 Amahuaca, Amazon, eastern Peru
 Asháninka, Amazon: Junín, Pasco, Huánuco, and Ucayali Regiona
 Aymara, who live primarily in the south.
 Bora, Amazon, north and eastern Peru
 Candoshi, Amazon: Loreto Region
 Cashibo, Amazon
 Chanka, whose direct descendants live primarily in Apurímac, Ayacucho and Lamas.
 Chincha, formerly the Pacific Coast
 Cholones, Amazon
 Cocama
 Cocamilla
 Ese Ejja, Amazon: Madre de Dios Region
 Harakmbut, Amazon: Madre de Dios Region
 Huambisa, Amazon
 Jibito, Amazon
 Jivaro, Amazon, northern Peru
 Shuar, Amazon
 Kaxinawá, Amazon
 Kulina, Amazon
 Korubo
 Machiguenga, Amazon, southeastern Peru
 Machinere, Amazon
 Maina, Amazon
 Mashco-Piro, Amazon: Madre de Dios Region
 Matsés (Mayoruna), Amazon
 Muinane
 Norte Chico civilization (9210–1800 BCE), Pacific coast
 Pocra culture (500–1000 CE), Pacific coast
 Ocaína
 Q'ero, Andes: Cusco Region
 Quechua, direct descendants of the common people from the Inca Empire, who are the majority in the coastal and Andean regions.
 Quijos-Quichua, lowland Quechua of the Napo river. Amazon: Loreto Region
 Canelos-Quichua, lowland Quechua of the Tigre and Corrientes rivers. Amazon: Loreto Region
 Southern Pastaza Quechua, lowland Quechua primarily living south of Andoas in the Pastaza River basin. Amazon: Loreto Region
 Lamas Quechua, lowland Quechua living along the Huallaga and Mayo rivers. Amazon: San Martín Region
 Secoya, Amazon, northern Peru
 Shapra, Amazon: Loreto Region
 Shipibo-Conibo, Amazon: eastern Peru
 Ticuna, Amazon
 Tukano
 Urarina, Amazon: Loreto Region
 Uru, Andes: Lake Titicaca
 Huanca, Andes: Junín Region
 Witoto (Huitoto), Amazon, northern Peru
 Yagua, Amazon: northeastern Peru
 Yaminawá, Amazon: Madre de Dios Region
 Yanesha', Amazon: Huánuco, Junín, and Pasco Regions
 Yine, Amazon: Cusco, Loreto, and Ucayali Regions
 Yukunas
 Zaparo, Amazon, northern Peru

See also

 Cerro de la Sal (Salt Mountain)
 Interethnic Association for the Development of the Peruvian Rainforest
 Indigenous peoples in South America
 Pre-Columbian goldworking of the Chibchan area

References

Citations

Bibliography
 
 Ideologia mesianico del mundo andino, Juan M. Ossio Acuña, Edicion de Ignacio Prado Pastor

External links
 Camino Inca: Inca Trail to Machu Picchu
  Camino Inca: Camino Inca a Machu Picchu

 
Peru
Ethnic groups in Peru
History of Peru